Van Rijswijk is a Dutch toponymic surname meaning "from/of Rijswijk". Among variant spellings are Van Rijsewijk, Rijswijck, Riswijk, and Ryswyk.
People with this name include:

Denise van Rijswijk (born 1978), Dutch pop singer
Jan Van Rijswijck (1853–1906),  Belgian lawyer, liberal politician and journalist
 (c.1550–1612), Dutch fortress builder
John van Rijswijck (born 1962), Luxembourg football goalkeeper
René van Rijswijk (born 1971), Dutch football forward
Ron Van Ryswyk (fl. 1960s), American football coach
Saskia van Rijswijk (born 1960), Dutch Muay Thai champion and actress
Theodoor van Rijswijck (1811–1849), Flemish writer

References

Dutch-language surnames
Toponymic surnames